Saturnia zuleika (commonly referred to as Neoris zuleika) is a moth of the family Saturniidae. It is found in India and West Bengal.

References

External links
 wildsilkmoth indonesia

Zuleika
Moths described in 1843